The University of Oklahoma Health Sciences Center is a public medical school in Oklahoma City, Oklahoma. It is the health sciences branch of the University of Oklahoma and serves as the primary place of instruction for many of Oklahoma's health professions. It is one of only four health centers in the United States with seven professional colleges.

The nineteen buildings that make up the OUHSC campus occupies a fifteen block area in Oklahoma City near the Oklahoma State Capitol. Surrounding these buildings are an additional twenty health-related buildings some of which are owned by the University of Oklahoma.  The Health Sciences Center is the core of a wider complex known as the Oklahoma Health Center. The major clinical facilities on campus are part of OU Medicine and include the OU Medical Center hospital complex, The Children's Hospital, OU Physicians and OU Children's Physicians clinics, Harold Hamm Diabetes Center and the Peggy and Charles Stephenson Oklahoma Cancer Center. Also part of the major clinical facilities is the Oklahoma City VA Medical Center.

History
The University of Oklahoma in Norman was founded in 1890, 17 years before Oklahoma's statehood, by the Oklahoma Territorial Legislature. In 1910, OU's fledgling two-year medical school moved to Oklahoma City and became a four-year program. A school of nursing was founded nearby the next year, and graduated its first class in 1913. In subsequent years a new university hospital was built, a graduate college for biomedical sciences was established, and the Oklahoma City Veterans Administration Hospital was constructed. A school of health was created in 1967, splitting twelve years later into a college of allied and public health. In 1971, the University of Oklahoma Medical Center became the University of Oklahoma Health Sciences Center and all schools on the HSC campus were designated as colleges. The College of Pharmacy, OU's oldest professional program, made the move from Norman to Oklahoma City five years later.

On July 1, 1993, the University Hospital system officially became independent of the State of Oklahoma Department of Health Services. In 1998, Columbia/HCA, a large hospital group based in Franklin, TN, entered into a joint agreement with the University Hospitals Authority and Trust (UHAT) to manage the hospitals. UHAT and community leaders founded the nonprofit, OU Medicine, which executed a $750 million buyout of HCA Healthcare's management agreement and ownership stake of its hospital facilities in 2018.

Institutions

Patient care institutions
 OU Medical Center
 The Children's Hospital at OU Medical Center
 Oklahoma City Veterans Administration Hospital
 Dean McGee Eye Institute
 Peggy and Charles Stephenson Oklahoma Cancer Center
 Harold Hamm Diabetes Center
 Oklahoma Blood Institute

Educational and research institutions
 University of Oklahoma
 College of Medicine
 College of Dentistry
 College of Nursing
 College of Allied Health
 Hudson College of Public Health
 College of Pharmacy
 Graduate College
 Robert M. Bird Health Sciences Library
 Children's Medical Research Institute
 Presbyterian Health Foundation
 Oklahoma Medical Research Foundation

Secondary schools
 Oklahoma School of Science and Mathematics

Government institutions
 Office of the Chief Medical Examiner
 Oklahoma State Department of Health
 Oklahoma State Department of Mental Health

References

External links
 Official website

Universities and colleges in Oklahoma City
University of Oklahoma
Public universities and colleges in Oklahoma
Buildings and structures in Oklahoma City
Hospitals established in 1971
Educational institutions established in 1971
1971 establishments in Oklahoma